The 1999 CAF Super Cup was the seventh CAF Super Cup, an annual football match organized by the Confederation of African Football (CAF), between the winners of the previous season's CAF Champions League and African Cup Winners' Cup competitions. The match was contested by 1998 CAF Champions League winners, ASEC Mimosas, and 1998 African Cup Winners' Cup winners, Espérance, at the Stade Félix Houphouët-Boigny in Abidjan, Côte d'Ivoire, on 7 February 2009.

After the regular 90 minutes ended in a 1–1 draw, Ivorian side ASEC Mimosas won the match 3–1 in extra time. This was the first title for ASEC and only the second Super Cup title won by Ivorian clubs, after Africa Sports (also based in Abidjan) won the first edition in 1993. As for Tunisian side Espérance, this was their second final, after they had won the 1995 Super Cup.

Teams

Match details

See also
1998 CAF Champions League
1998 African Cup Winners' Cup

References

Super
1999
Sport in Abidjan
ASEC Mimosas matches
Espérance ST matches